Tadeusz Mytnik (born 13 August 1949) is a retired Polish cyclist. He had his best achievements in the 100 km  team time trial. In this event he won a silver medal at the 1976 Summer Olympics as well as two gold and one bronze medals at the world championships in 1973, 1975 and 1977. Individually, he won the Tour de Pologne in 1975, Tour of Małopolska in 1978, Flèche d'Or in 1981, and Szlakiem Grodów Piastowskich in 1983. In 2010 he was awarded the Order of Polonia Restituta.

After retiring from competitions he ran a bicycle shop in Gdynia and organized cycling races. He is married to Wiesława Mytnik; they have two children, Marcin (born 1976) and  Agnieszka (born 1979).

References

External links

1949 births
Living people
People from Świdnica County
Cyclists at the 1976 Summer Olympics
Olympic cyclists of Poland
Polish male cyclists
Olympic silver medalists for Poland
Olympic medalists in cycling
Sportspeople from Lower Silesian Voivodeship
UCI Road World Champions (elite men)
Medalists at the 1976 Summer Olympics